Big Brutus is the nickname of the Bucyrus-Erie model 1850-B electric shovel, which was the second largest of its type in operation in the 1960s and 1970s. Big Brutus is the centerpiece of a mining museum in West Mineral, Kansas, United States where it was used in coal strip mining operations. The shovel was designed to dig from  down to unearth relatively shallow coal seams, which would themselves be mined with smaller equipment.

Description
Fabrication of Big Brutus was completed in May 1963, after which it was shipped on 150 railroad cars to be assembled in Kansas.  It operated until 1974, when it became uneconomical to mine coal at the site.  At that time it was considered too big to move and was left in place.

Big Brutus, while not the largest electric shovel ever built, is the largest electric shovel still in existence. The Captain, at  – triple that of Big Brutus – was the largest shovel and one of the largest land-based mobile machines ever built, only exceeded by some dragline and bucket-wheel excavators. It was scrapped in 1992, after receiving extreme damage from an hours-long internal fire.

Museum
The Pittsburg & Midway Coal Mining Company donated Big Brutus in 1984 as the core of a mining museum which opened in 1985.  In 1987, the American Society of Mechanical Engineers designated Big Brutus a Regional Historic Mechanical Engineering Landmark.  It was listed on the National Register of Historic Places in 2018.

The museum offers tours and camping.

Fatal accident
On January 16, 2010, Mark Mosley, a 49-year-old dentist from Lowell, Arkansas, died attempting to base-jump from the top of the boom. Climbing the boom had been prohibited years earlier; after the accident, the attraction's board of directors considered additional restrictions on climbing. During the accident's investigation, examiner Tom Dolphin determined that Mosley had accidentally fallen off the boom while preparing to jump.

See also
 The Silver Spade
 Bucket wheel excavator
 Dragline
 Dump truck
 Excavator
 Marion Power Shovel
 Power shovel
 National Register of Historic Places listings in Cherokee County, Kansas

References

External links 

 
 Big Brutus, Sept. 1987, The American Society of Mechanical Engineers

Stripping shovels
Museums in Cherokee County, Kansas
Mining museums in Kansas
Mining equipment
National Register of Historic Places in Cherokee County, Kansas
Bucyrus-Erie